Helge Torvund (born 20 August 1951) is a Norwegian psychologist, poet, essayist, literary critic and children's writer. He was born in Hå, and is brother of sculptor Gunnar Torvund.

He made his literary debut in 1977 with Hendene i byen. In 1989 he was awarded the Nynorsk Literature Prize for the poetry collection Den monotone triumf. He received the Herman Wildenvey Poetry Award in 2016.
From 2015 he has been writing monthly in the newspaper Klassekampen. One of these articles has been translated and published by York Art Gallery as "Carnal Light".

He was awarded the Dobloug Prize in 2018.

References

1951 births
Living people
People from Hå
20th-century Norwegian poets
Norwegian male poets
Norwegian essayists
Norwegian children's writers
Male essayists
20th-century essayists
20th-century Norwegian male writers